Cherokee Voices, Cherokee Sounds is a radio program produced by the Cherokee Nation. The program features songs in the Cherokee language, interviews with speakers of the Cherokee language, and news and podcasts in both Cherokee and English. The show is hosted by Dennis Sixkiller, a Cherokee first-language speaker, and has been produced since 2004.

Cherokee Voices, Cherokee Sounds currently airs on KEOK and KTLQ in Tahlequah; KGND in Vinita; KWON in Bartlesville; and KRSC-FM in Claremore.

References

Cherokee language
Works about the Cherokee Nation
Native American history of Oklahoma
American radio programs